Kalinina is a rural locality (a village) in Leninskoye Rural Settlement, Kudymkarsky District, Perm Krai, Russia. The population was 40 as of 2010.

Geography 
It is located 62 km south from Kudymkar.

References 

Rural localities in Kudymkarsky District